Eric Campbell,  (11 April 1893 – 2 September 1970) was an Australian army officer and solicitor who was the leader of the far-right organisation, the New Guard in New South Wales. He created the New Guard as a deviation of an existing paramilitary group called the Old Guard. Campbell had grown frustrated with the direction the group was headed in and so he aimed to revive the Old Guard's original ideology within the New Guard. He also aimed to directly oppose Jack Lang's Labour Party in New South Wales and endorsed his fellow Guardsmen to interfere in Lang's public political activities.

Campbell was born in Young, New South Wales. He became a solicitor in 1919 and worked in various regions around New South Wales. He was a popular figure among the communities he worked in and was a member of several social clubs in the area. Campbell also had success in his career as a business man and found himself in leading positions in many large Australian companies at the time.

In 1924, he joined a paramilitary group, later titled the Old Guard and was given the title of lieutenant-colonel a year later. He created the New Guard in 1931. Support for Campbell's New Guard began to wane after its mission was accomplished with the defeat of Lang in the June 1932 New South Wales state election. Campbell became further involved in politics and publicly announced his running in the next state elections and advocated for fascism in New South Wales. In early 1933, Campbell travelled around Europe and met with politicians from Britain, Germany and Italy, most notably Sir Oswald Mosley, leader of the British Union of Fascists. Later in that same year, Campbell would create the Centre Party in order to manifest his political goals, however, the support for this movement and the New Guard would further decline as many members were against the true fascist nature of the group. Campbell's Centre Party was defeated in the 1935 New South Wales state election and the party itself was shortly disbanded following the loss.

Campbell lived the rest of his life in the country in New South Wales after retirement. He continued his interest in politics, becoming the president of the Burrangong Shire Council from 1949 to 1950. He later died in 1970 due to cancer, while living in Canberra.

Early life
Eric Campbell was born in Young, New South Wales, to Allan Campbell, a solicitor, and his wife Florence Mary Russell and was the fourth and youngest son.  After a private education and a period as articled clerk at his father's firm, he joined the Australian Imperial Force as a lieutenant in April 1916. He served in France, during the Battle of the Somme and was gassed in November 1917.

Life after World War I 
Campbell returned to Sydney from World War I on board the SS Anchises in April 1919, where he completed his legal studies, and became a solicitor on the 29th of August 1919. He commenced work as a solicitor in partnership with S.G Rowe, where he stayed for six years, from 1920 to 1926. Campbell, along with two of his brothers, founded and operated their own legal practice, named Campbell, Campbell and Campbell. The practice operated out of Pitt Street in the Sydney central business district and had a variety of clients, including cattle farmers, businessmen as well as other professionals and financial institutions. By 1931, Campbell was living and working in Turramurra as a well-known businessman and solicitor where he was on the board of directors for Australian Soap Ltd and Discount and Finance Ltd as well as working in corporate roles in other companies.

Campbell married on the 22nd of October 1924 to Nancy Emma Browne at Memagong Station in Young, New South Wales. With his wife, he had two sons and two daughters.

Campbell had an active social life and was a member of a number of clubs, including the Imperial Service Club and the Union. He was an avid golfer and was a member of Royal Sydney and Killara Golf, both of which were golf clubs at the time. Campbell was a Freemason and a member of the Sydney Rotary Club and had passions in tennis, gardening, surfing and motoring.

For his military service, Campbell was awarded a Distinguished Service Order in January 1919.

Participation in militia groups in Australia

Initial participation and the Old Guard 

In 1924, Campbell was the commander of the 9th Field Artillery Brigade and eventually became the lieutenant-colonel in 1925. In the same year, Campbell, along with fellow army officer William John Scott recruited 500 ex-soldiers to suppress a strike involving some sailors. This action became Campbell's first involvement within paramilitary measures within Australia. This small group of soldiers later became an official group of vigilantes run by Sir Robert Gillespie and Sir Philip Goldfinch, of which Campbell was the head recruitment officer. The group (later named the Old Guard) was made up of middle-class professionals but also included farmers, ex-soldiers and labourers, who were disillusioned with Jack Lang and his labour government and did not believe in the government's ability to assist with the onset of the Great Depression in 1929.

Creation of the New Guard 
Campbell was frustrated with the changes made to the Old Guard's principles and broke off, forming his own group on the 18th of February 1931, called the New Guard, aimed to be a revival of the Old Guard's original ideas. Campbell wanted to stress loyalty to the British Empire and made patriotism one of his key ideas. He also stated that he wanted “sane and honourable government” and the “abolishment of machine politics” and pursued the idea of bringing Australians together, regardless of their ideologies, political views and socio-economic status. The fundamental ideology of Campbell's New Guard was written out in the Attestation Paper and was signed by all Guardsmen. The final version, as written by Campbell, of these papers reads as follows:

Campbell became the commanding officer of the New Guard and under his leadership, the paramilitary group reached 60,000 members at its peak, which also included a small amount of women as part of an auxiliary group. Most of the members were of middle-class socio-economic status and many worked within managerial positions in local businesses and others as business professionals. Around 18% of the group were tradesmen, whose occupations included: labourers, carpenters, plumbers and mechanics. Although Campbell claimed otherwise, the group was heavily opposed by the working class, except for members of the Railway Service Association, which was a right-leaning group. In December 1931, the New South Wales police force estimated that 25% of the men who made up the Guard had previous military experience.

The group was known for breaking up Communist meetings and having its members spread criticism about the New South Wales Labour Party. Irish fascist Francis de Groot was a notable member of the group and is known for interrupting the formal opening of the Sydney Harbour Bridge.

Entry into Australian politics 
Campbell used the New Guard as a tool to further his political career. He specifically aimed to end Lang's career as a politician as he was critical of Lang and the political and economic policies regarding the Great Depression put forward by Lang's Labour government. Campbell attained this goal in May 1932, when Lang was dismissed by Sir Philip Game, the Governor of New South Wales at the time, due to financial issues regarding Lang's term as premier. Lang was replaced by Bertram Stevens and Campbell and the New Guard's primary goal was accomplished.

Members of the Campbell's New Guard were demotivated following the Lang's dismissal and the group subsequently declined in its membership. The New Guard lost more of its popularity in 1932 when eight New Guard officers were arrested and charged with the assault of John Smith Garden, a Baptist minister at the time. 

In early 1933, Campbell visited Germany, Italy and Britain, where he spoke to fascist leaders and politicians and met with Sir Oswald Mosley, leader of the British Union of Fascists. He used this meeting to gain introductions to other European leaders, including Italian dictator Benito Mussolini and German leader Adolf Hitler. While in Germany, Campbell witnessed a rally of 100,000 Nazis in front of the Imperial Palace in Unter den Linden and was impressed by the Nazis' "great spirit of co-operation".

Campbell founded the Centre Party in December 1933, with "over 1000 people" present at its declaration. The Sydney Morning Herald was present and reported that the party would establish "100 branches" of leadership. Campbell's interest in electoral politics heavily influenced the involvement of the New Guard and a majority of those who remained approved this move.

The eventual result of Campbell's leadership of the New Guard was his publication of the book The New Road, in which he made his arguments for fascism in Australia and wanted to create a corporate state.

Life post New Guard

Fraud charge and resulting legal action 
In 1938, Campbell was charged with defrauding Du Menier Laboratories, but he was acquitted in 1939 after he reached an agreement with Judge Reginald Heath Innes requiring Campbell to pay a fine but allowed him to remain working as a lawyer.

Later life and work 
Campbell had moved to Billaboola in 1941 and was still a practising lawyer working in Young. He still had an interest in politics as he was the president of the Burrangong Shire Council from 1949 to 1950.

In 1957, Campbell bought a piece of land near Yass and moved there to live the same year.

Death 
In 1966, Campbell had moved to Canberra and was working as a solicitor, but due to injuries he sustained from an accident, was unable to do so for long. Campbell died of cancer in 1970 in Canberra.

In popular culture 
In the grand strategy video game Hearts of Iron 4, Campbell can become the leader of Australia if the ruling party of the country changes to fascist ideology.

Bibliography 

 Amos, K. (1979). Australian Dictionary of Biography (7th ed.). Melbourne University Press.
 Moore, A. (2005, November 15). The New Guard. http://workers.labor.net.au/features/200313/c_historicalfeature_moore.html
 Beercroft-Cheltenham History Group. New Guard and Old Guard. https://www.bchg.org.au/index.php/en/changing-times/polies/new-guard-and-old-     guard
 Mitchell, P. (1969, September 1).  Australian Patriots: A Study of the New Guard. Australian Economic History Review, 9(2). https://doi.org/10.1111/aehr.92004
 Moore, A. (2011, June 27). Discredited Fascism: the New Guard after 1932. Australian Journal of Politics and History, 57(2). https://doi.org/10.1111/j.1467-8497.2011.01591.x
 Moore, A. (2005, November). The New Guard and the Labour Movement, 1931-35. Labour History, 89. 55-72. https://doi.org/10.2307/27516075
 Campbell, E. (1965). The Rallying Point: My Story of the New Guard. Melbourne University Press.
 Darlington, R. (1983). Eric Campbell & the New Guard. Kangaroo Press.
Cunningham, M. (2012). Australian Fascism? A Revisionist Analysis of the Ideology of the New Guard. Politics, Religion and Ideology. 13(3). 375-393. https://www.tandfonline.com/doi/abs/10.1080/21567689.2012.701188
McCarthy, John Malcolm. & New South Wales. Parliamentary Library. & University of Sydney. Department of Government.  (1998).  The New South Wales state election, 1935.  Sydney :  NSW Parliamentary Library [and] Dept. of Government, University of Sydney. ISBN 0731311744.

References

Further reading

Australian fascists
Australian nationalists
Australian solicitors
History of New South Wales
People from Young, New South Wales
1893 births
1970 deaths
Australian military personnel of World War I
Australian colonels
Deaths from cancer in the Australian Capital Territory